Mala Nedelja (in older sources also Mala Nedela) is a small settlement in the eastern part of the Slovene Hills in the Municipality of Ljutomer in northeastern Slovenia. The area traditionally belonged to the Styria region and is now included in the Mura Statistical Region.

History
Mala Nedelja was formerly part of Bučkovci. It was made a separate settlement in 1991.

Church
The local parish church is dedicated to the Holy Trinity and belongs to the Roman Catholic Diocese of Murska Sobota. It was first mentioned in written documents dating to 1441. The belfry was added in 1521 and in the mid-16th century a second nave was built.

Notable people
Notable people that were born or lived in Mala Nedelja include:
János Murkovics (1839–1917), writer

References

External links

Mala Nedelja on Geopedia

Populated places in the Municipality of Ljutomer
Spa towns in Slovenia